Marquee Theatre (originally known as the Red River Opry or the Red River Music Hall) is a music venue in Tempe, Arizona. The theater sits on the north side of Tempe Town Lake near the Mill Avenue Bridge, at the intersection of Mill Avenue and Washington Street, the primary business and entertainment district in Tempe.

About
The venue originally opened January 1993 as the "Red River Opry" (often referred to as the "Red River Music Hall") and catered for country music. The Opry filed for bankruptcy in 2001 and closed later that year. The venue was purchased by Nobody In Particular Presents in 2002. After a year of renovations, the theatre opened in March 2003.

Tom LaPenna purchased the venue a year later. His company, Lucky Man Concerts (formerly Lucky Man Productions) has owned and operated the theatre since March 29, 2004.

The theater features festival seating and the back of the house is approximately 80 feet from the stage. It is open to all ages and alcoholic beverages are served with proper ID. Due to the Arizona smoking laws, there is no smoking permitted inside but a large outdoor patio is provided. The theatre is popular with the students of nearby Arizona State University and caters to the college-age demographic.

Noted performers

 Adele
 Al Di Meola
 American Music Club
 Angels & Airwaves
 Barenaked Ladies
 Bo Diddley
 Broken Bells
 David Wilcox
 Glen Campbell
 Herbie Hancock
 Jerry Jeff Walker
 Jimmy Eat World
 Katy Perry
 The Killers
 Kings of Leon
 Kongos
 The Meat Puppets
 Muse
 Neon Trees
 Nine Inch Nails
 Panic! at the Disco
 Pete Yorn
 Peter Beckett
 Prince
 Riders in the Sky
 The Rippingtons
 Sarah McLachlan
 Scary Kids Scaring Kids
 Sia
 Skip Ewing
 Stone Temple Pilots
 The Cramps
 The Used
 Willie Nelson
 Wolfmother

References

External links
 
 Arizona Central venue guide
 Phoenix New Times venue guide

Music venues in Arizona
Theatres in Arizona
Buildings and structures in Tempe, Arizona
Tourist attractions in Tempe, Arizona
Music venues completed in 1993
1993 establishments in Arizona